Zak's Lunch is a book written by Margie Palatini and illustrated by Howard Fine. It is about a boy named Zak who refuses to eat the ham and cheese sandwich his mother made for him for lunch and goes into his imagination of a restaurant.

Summary 

Zak's mother calls him to come into the kitchen to eat lunch. Zak skips down the stairs two at a time, and his dog, George skids on the linoleum, and they enter the kitchen. When Zak sat at the counter, his mother made him a ham and cheese sandwich, and he made a yucky face. He told his mother he doesn't want to eat the ham and cheese sandwich. His mother told him that this is not a restaurant and that she wants to see that sandwich gone. Zak thought to himself that his mother was having a very ornery day, but he was the one that was having an ornery day, because he did not want to eat the sandwich. Whenever he stared at it, he mumbled, grumbled, and groaned at it. Then, he believed that it should be restaurant, plus it excludes the ham and cheese sandwich.

In his imagination, he and George were in a restaurant called Zak's Place, which also had the sign of its name in bright purple neon lights. There was a waitress named Lou that had frizzy red curls, teeny tiny frilly hat, and a pale blue uniform with a big pocket and her name written on it in red. Then, Zak began ordering some food. At first, Zak said that he would like a hamburger, but Lou asked him whether or not it is a bit boring. Then, Zak changed his mind to get a triple-decker, super-duper, cheeseburger deluxe, plus a pound of pickles. There was a cook named Cookie that was cooking the hamburgers. Next, Zak ordered French Fries with "skinnies" and "" and that curlicue around, and he raised his hand to pile them that high. Then, Zak ordered a pizza that is the size of bicycle tires for George to eat but to make it two. Then, Zak and George were eating their foods. Next, Zak asked whether they have chicken. Lou called out to Cookie to fry the bird all pins. Then Zak ordered a tub of spaghetti with meatballs the size of baseballs, hot dogs with chili, and nachos with cheese. While Zak and George were eating the spaghetti, Zak asked Lou what they have to drink, and Lou said that they have every drink, and Zak ordered her to "Line 'em up." Then Zak and George were drinking every drink lined up on the counter. Then there was dessert: a mountain of vanilla and a hill of chocolate. Then, Lou got all covered up with vanilla. Zak was calling Lou if it was her.

Then, Zak's mother was calling him as Zak continued to say Lou's name. Then, George barked to get Zak out of his imagination of being in a restaurant. When Zak looked around the room, there was nothing that was only in his imagination. There was only him, his mother, George, and his lunch. His mother told him again that she wants to see that sandwich gone. Zak mumbled, grumbled, groaned, and made a yucky face again. When his mother turned around, he made George eat his sandwich. The mother thought Zak ate the sandwich.

External links
Reviewer's Bookwatch
Publishers Weekly review and School Library Journal review

Children's fiction books
American picture books
1998 children's books
Clarion Books books